Apurna Narzary (born 8 January 2004) is an Indian professional footballer who plays as a forward for Kerala Women's League club Kerala Blasters and the India national team.

Club career
Apurna started her senior career with Indian Arrows and played for them in the Indian Women's League. She Scored six goals in seven appearances for the Arrows and two Hero of the Match awards. She also scored a hat-trick in a 4–0 win against Odisha Police. In 2022, she was signed by Kerala Blasters as a part of their newly launched women's team.

International career

Apurna debuted for India at the junior level in 2022, after represented the India U-18 team at the 2022 SAFF U-18 Women's Championship. In September 2022, she was included in the final 23 squad of Indian team to play in the 2022 SAFF Women's Championship.

References

External links 
 Apurna Narzary at All India Football Federation
 

Living people
Footballers from Assam
Sportswomen from Assam
Indian women's footballers
India women's international footballers
India women's youth international footballers
Women's association football forwards
2004 births
Indian Women's League players
Kerala Blasters FC Women players